El Cerrito (Spanish for "The Little Hill") is a census-designated place (CDP) in Riverside County, California, United States. It is an unincorporated area mostly surrounded by the city of Corona. The population was 5,100 at the 2010 census, up from 4,590 at the 2000 census.

Geography
El Cerrito is located southeast of downtown Corona and about 15 miles (25 km) southwest of the city of Riverside.

Demographics

2010
At the 2010 census El Cerrito had a population of 5,100. The racial makeup of El Cerrito was 3,542 (69.5%) White, 91 (1.8%) African American, 54 (1.1%) Native American, 95 (1.9%) Asian, 11 (0.2%) Pacific Islander, 1,122 (22.0%) from other races, and 185 (3.6%) from two or more races. Hispanic or Latino of any race were 2,657 persons (52.1%).

The census reported that 5,088 people (99.8% of the population) lived in households, 12 (0.2%) lived in non-institutionalized group quarters, and no one was institutionalized.

There were 1,386 households, 648 (46.8%) had children under the age of 18 living in them, 937 (67.6%) were opposite-sex married couples living together, 153 (11.0%) had a female householder with no husband present, 97 (7.0%) had a male householder with no wife present.  There were 71 (5.1%) unmarried opposite-sex partnerships, and 13 (0.9%) same-sex married couples or partnerships. 126 households (9.1%) were one person and 50 (3.6%) had someone living alone who was 65 or older. The average household size was 3.67.  There were 1,187 families (85.6% of households); the average family size was 3.82.

The age distribution was 1,380 people (27.1%) under the age of 18, 548 people (10.7%) aged 18 to 24, 1,274 people (25.0%) aged 25 to 44, 1,387 people (27.2%) aged 45 to 64, and 511 people (10.0%) who were 65 or older.  The median age was 35.7 years. For every 100 females, there were 109.0 males.  For every 100 females age 18 and over, there were 104.6 males.

There were 1,449 housing units at an average density of 521.7 per square mile, of the occupied units 1,099 (79.3%) were owner-occupied and 287 (20.7%) were rented. The homeowner vacancy rate was 1.2%; the rental vacancy rate was 4.0%.  3,991 people (78.3% of the population) lived in owner-occupied housing units and 1,097 people (21.5%) lived in rental housing units.

2000
As of the census of 2000, there were 4,590 people, 1,292 households, and 1,122 families in the CDP. The racial makeup of the CDP was 71.0% White, 2.2% Black or African American, 0.9% Native American, 1.2% Asian, 0.5% Pacific Islander, 19.8% from other races, and 4.3% from two or more races.  37.2% of the population were Hispanic or Latino of any race.

Of the 1,292 households 45.7% had children under the age of 18 living with them, 72.7% were married couples living together, 9.1% had a female householder with no husband present, and 13.1% were non-families. 9.4% of households were one person and 2.2% were one person aged 65 or older.  The average household size was 3.6 and the average family size was 3.7.

The age distribution was 31.3% under the age of 18, 9.4% from 18 to 24, 28.9% from 25 to 44, 23.5% from 45 to 64, and 7.0% 65 or older.  The median age was 33 years. For every 100 females, there were 108.6 males.  For every 100 females age 18 and over, there were 105.7 males.

The median household income was $61,190 and the median family income  was $62,981. Males had a median income of $42,552 versus $36,886 for females. The per capita income for the CDP was $19,466.  About 5.2% of families and 8.5% of the population were below the poverty line, including 11.1% of those under age 18 and 5.0% of those age 65 or over.

Government

Municipal
In the Riverside County Board of Supervisors, El Cerrito is in the Second District, represented by Karen Spiegel.

State

Federal
Democrats Dianne Feinstein and Alex Padilla represent California in the United States Senate.

References

Census-designated places in Riverside County, California
Census-designated places in California